Mitsumori is a Japanese surname, masculine given name, and toponym.

Kanji
Kanji used to write the name Mitsumori include:
: "three forests", "third forest". Also read Mimori, Mitsunomori, or Sanmori.
: "three protections", "third protection". Also read Mimori, Sanmori, or Tadamori.
: "three protections", "third protection".
: "bright protection". These characters are also used to write the Korean given name Kwang-su.
: "bright forest". Also read Kōmori.
: "bright and thriving". Also read Kōsei.
: "abundant forest"
: "abundant and thriving"

People
People and characters with the surname Mitsumori include:
 Japanese volleyball player
, Japanese racewalker, represented Japan at the 1996 Summer Olympics
Dr. Mitsumori, a fictional character in the video game franchise Bomberman

Places

There is a Mount Mitsumori (三森山) near Ena, Gifu.

References

Japanese-language surnames
Japanese masculine given names